WOXX (97.1 FM) is a radio station licensed to serve Colebrook, New Hampshire, United States, serving the Northern New Hampshire area. The station is owned by White Mountains Broadcasting LLC.

On December 22, 2011, WOXX signed on the air with a classic hits & classic rock hybrid format branded as "The Outlaw" just like WOTX. The station's call sign is similar to a similarly-formatted sister station in Lunenburg, Vermont, WOTX; however, WOXX is operated separately.

References

External links

OXX
Coös County, New Hampshire
Radio stations established in 2011
Classic rock radio stations in the United States